Ali Wentworth (born January 12, 1965) is an American actress, comedian, author, and producer.

Early life 
Wentworth's mother, Muffie Cabot (née Mabel Bryant Hobart), was Nancy Reagan's White House social secretary from 1981 to 1983. Her father, Eric Wentworth, was a reporter for The Washington Post. Her stepfather, Henry Brandon, was the Washington correspondent for The Sunday Times of London, and her maternal grandmother was Janet Elliott Wulsin, an explorer.

Wentworth attended the Dana Hall School for Girls in Wellesley, Massachusetts, and studied drama at Bard College in Annandale-on-Hudson, New York before she graduated from New York University.

Career 
Wentworth debuted as a cast member on the Fox sketch comedy series In Living Color from 1992 to 1994. On the program she was known for performing impressions of Cher, Amy Fisher, Hillary Clinton, Princess Diana, Brooke Shields, Lisa Marie Presley, Sharon Stone, and other characters. Her recurring characters included Candy Cane, a deranged kids' show host who had had a string of bad relationships with her male coworkers, and the promiscuous teenage daughter of Grandpa Jack McGee (Jim Carrey) on The Dysfunctional Home Show.

Wentworth made appearances as a correspondent on The Tonight Show with Jay Leno and The Oprah Winfrey Show. In 1995, she played Jerry Seinfeld's girlfriend Sheila ("Schmoopie") in the memorable "Soup Nazi" episode of Seinfeld. She had a recurring role as the boss of the title character on the WB series Felicity. 

In 2003, she co-hosted the syndicated talk show Living It Up! with Ali & Jack with Jack Ford. Since that show's cancellation and before, she has been a regular part of the guest host rotation for Live with Kelly and Ryan when Kelly Ripa is on vacation or has other commitments.

Wentworth starred in the comedy Head Case on the Starz television network. She guest starred on the NBC show The Marriage Ref. She hosted Daily Shot, a short daily talk show segment on Yahoo! Shine.

In 2016, Wentworth created and starred in Nightcap as the lead character Staci Cole. The series was broadcast for two seasons.

Wentworth appeared as a celebrity guest on the July 23, 2017 episode (S2 E07) of The $100,000 Pyramid, opposite Kathy Najimy, helping her contestant partner win the $150,000 grand prize. In 2020, Wentworth launched a podcast Go Ask Ali in partnership with shondaland audio. In 2022, she published a book, Ali's Well That Ends Well, about finding humor in the COVID-19 pandemic.

Personal life 
Wentworth is married to George Stephanopoulos, ABC News chief anchor, correspondent and former political adviser to the Clinton administration. They met on a blind date in April 2001 and were engaged two months later. They married on November 20, 2001, at the Archdiocesan Cathedral of the Holy Trinity on New York City's Upper East Side in a lengthy service. They have two daughters: Elliott Anastasia Stephanopoulos (born September 9, 2002) and Harper Andrea Stephanopoulos (born June 2, 2005).

In an episode of Comedians in Cars Getting Coffee, Wentworth said a "well-known writer" once offered $40,000 to spend a night with her.

Bibliography
 The WASP Cookbook, Warner Adult, 1997. .
 Ali in Wonderland: And Other Tall Tales, 2012, Harper Collins 
 Happily Ali After: And Other Fairly True Tales, HarperCollins, 2015. . .
 Go Ask Ali: Half-Baked Advice (and Free Lemonade), Harper, 2018. .
 Ali's Well that Ends Well, HarperCollins, 2022.

Screen credits

Actress

1992: In Living Color ... Various (63 episodes, 1992–1994)
1994: Hardball ... Lee Emory (unknown episodes)
1995: Seinfeld ... Sheila (1 episode, 1995)
1996: Life Among the Cannibals ... Suicidal Singer
1996: Big Packages ... Susan
1996: Jerry Maguire ... Bobbi Fallon
1997: Trial and Error ... Tiffany Whitfield
1997: The Real Blonde ... Raina
1997: The Love Bug (TV) ... Alex Davis
1999: Office Space ... Anne
1999: Felicity ... Abby (2 episodes)
2000: Meeting Daddy  ... Melanie Branson
2001: Call Me Claus ... Lucy
2009: It's Complicated ... Diane
2016–2017: Nightcap ... Staci Cole

Self
2012–14: Daily Shot With Ali Wentworth ... Host 
2014: Comedians in Cars Getting Coffee (Crackle.com) ... Herself (season 5, episode 6)
2015–22: Live with Kelly and Ryan ... Guest Host
2022: Would I Lie to You? (US)... Herself (Episode: "Banana Bread")
2022: The Parent Test...Host

Writer / Producer
2007: Head Case (28 episodes, 2007–2009)

References

External links

 Alexandra Wentworth in Starz Head Case
Head Games with Ali Wentworth, tv.com, Laura Swisher, January 30, 2008

American film actresses
American stage actresses
American television actresses
Bard College alumni
Living people
1965 births
American women comedians
21st-century American actresses
20th-century American actresses
Actresses from Washington, D.C.
American television personalities
American women television personalities
Writers from Washington, D.C.
American cookbook writers
American memoirists
Women cookbook writers
American women memoirists
Comedians from Washington, D.C.
20th-century American comedians
21st-century American comedians
Dana Hall School alumni